Robert A. Kotick (born 1963) is an American businessman who serves as the chief executive officer (CEO) of Activision Blizzard. He became CEO of Activision in 1991 after purchasing a company stake the previous year. Kotick engineered a merger between Activision and Vivendi Games during the late 2000s, which led to the creation of Activision Blizzard in 2008 and him being named the company's inaugural CEO. He has also served on several boards, including The Coca-Cola Company from 2012 to 2022, and Yahoo from 2003 to 2008.

Early life 
Robert A. Kotick was born in 1963 in the US, and grew up in New York. His interest in business began at an early age. In junior high school, Kotick had his own business cards, and in high school, he ran a business renting out Manhattan clubs on off nights. He studied art history at the University of Michigan in the early 1980s.

Career

Early career 
While Kotick was still a student in 1983 at the University of Michigan, he started a technology company called Arktronics with friend Howard Marks in their dorm room. The two developed software for the Apple II. During his sophomore year, Kotick met and pitched Steve Wynn to invest in Arktronics. Wynn later invested $300,000 in the company. Steve Jobs heard about Arktronics' software. He met with Kotick and Marks in Ann Arbor and advised them to drop out of college to focus on the software business. Kotick took the advice and left the University of Michigan to focus all of his time on his company.

In 1987, Kotick tried to acquire Commodore International. He planned to remove the keyboard and disk drive from the Amiga 500 and turn it into a video game system. He was unsuccessful in persuading Commodore's then-Chairman Irving Gould to sell control of the company. Kotick was CEO of Leisure Concepts from June 1990 to December 1990.

In December 1990, Kotick and his partner Brian Kelly bought a 25% stake in the almost-bankrupt Activision, then known as Mediagenic. He changed the name back to Activision, performed a full restructuring of the company, and refocused the company on video games. Kotick became CEO of Activision in February 1991. From 1997 to 2003, Activision acquired nine development studios and released its first hit game in 1995.

At Activision, Kotick set out to build "an institutional quality, well-managed company with a focus on the independent developer." In a June 14, 2010, interview with gaming blog Kotaku, Kotick stated, "…[P]art of the whole philosophy of Activision was whether you're owned outright or not, if you're a studio you have control of your destiny, you could make decisions about who to hire, flexibility on what products to make, how to make them, schedules appropriate to make them, budgets."

Kotick also served as a founder of International Consumer Technologies and was president from 1986 to January 1995.  In 1995, International Consumer Technologies became a wholly owned subsidiary of Activision.

Activision Blizzard 
In November 2006, Kotick started discussing a merger with the games division of Vivendi, a French entertainment conglomerate, which included Blizzard Entertainment and Sierra Entertainment.  Kotick engineered the Activision Blizzard merger, which created a new company, Activision Blizzard. Shareholders of Activision Blizzard approved Kotick as CEO of the combined company on July 9, 2008. Kotick said he aimed to build on Blizzard's successes in the Asian market to introduce Activision's games there.

Kotick has used Activision Blizzard's industry position to push partners for changes that he maintains would benefit the gaming community. In July 2009, Kotick threatened to stop making games for the PlayStation 3 platform if Sony did not cut the price of the console. Kotick also urged the British government to reward Activision for continuing to invest in the country's pool of game developers by providing Activision with the same kinds of tax incentives provided by Canada, Singapore, and eastern bloc countries. Kotick has launched an Independent Games Competition with $500,000 in total available prize money for small developers working with new platforms and has stated that "keeping passion in game development is something that's important to him."

In October 2016, Kotick announced the creation of Activision Blizzard's Overwatch League. Earlier that same year, Activision had acquired companies such as King and Major League Gaming. In June 2017, Fortune reported that Kotick had become "the longest-serving head of any publicly traded tech company." Under him, the company has approved the development of films based on its video games and had developed new esports projects.

Sexual harassment investigation 

Kotick and Andrew Gordon, the head of Goldman Sachs's Los Angeles division, formed Cove Management to operate a private Gulfstream III jet they jointly owned. They hired pilot Phil Berg and former actress Cynthia Madvig as a flight attendant. Berg began sexually harassing Madvig shortly after their hiring, but Gordon did nothing after Madvig reported this to him. Kotick fired her shortly after she talked to Gordon. Madvig filed a sexual harassment and wrongful termination suit against Cove Management and Berg. During the litigation, Kotick brought the firm Christensen, Glaser, Fink, Jacobs, Weil & Shapiro to defend them, but Patricia Glaser advised them to settle with Madvig for $200,000. Kotick refused, alleged by the arbitrator that "[he] would not be extorted and that [he] would ruin the Plaintiff and her attorney and see to it that Ms. Madvig would never work again." After hiring a new firm, Cove eventually settled with Madvig for $200,000 and an additional $475,000 for her legal fees. Kotick then became involved in further litigation with Glaser's firm as he only paid them $200,000 for their legal services when Glaser stated the full amount was for more than $1 million. By February 2009, the case was decided in Glaser's favor, awarding them over $1.42 million including legal fees from Kotick. This ruling was upheld on appeals.

In July 2021, the California Department of Fair Employment and Housing announced it had filed a lawsuit against Activision Blizzard due to workplace misconduct and discrimination by several employees. Kotick was not named in the initial suit. Kotick stated that the company would begin a series of reforms, including an internal investigation of the reports and adapting a zero tolerance policy related to workplace misconduct. Kotick also stated he would have the board reduce his salary to the minimum allowed by California law and forgo other benefits until the situation was resolved.

An investigative report from The Wall Street Journal in November 2021 identified that despite his earlier claim, Kotick had been well aware of the past allegations mentioned in the California lawsuit but did nothing to change corporate policy, and had protected an employee who sexually harassed from being fired. Further, the report asserted that Kotick himself had threatened to kill an assistant on their voice mail. Activision Blizzard's board issued a statement that supported Kotick's efforts to lead the company, while employees, shareholders, and other voices from the industry urged Kotick to resign or to be replaced in light of these allegations.

Board memberships 

Kotick is a non-executive director for The Coca-Cola Company and a board member at the Center for Early Education and the Los Angeles County Museum of Art. He previously served as a Yahoo! board member from March 2003 to August 2008.

In 2019, Kotick's total compensation at Activision Blizzard fell to $30.1 million, down from his 2018 package of $31 million in salary, bonus, perks, stock and options. 85% of his 2018 compensation came from stock and options. He was the 21st most highly compensated CEO in the United States that year. He also earned 319 times more than the average Activision Blizzard employee's salary of $97,000 in that year, putting him in 75th place among U.S. CEOs. He is working under a deal inked in November 2016 with Activision Blizzard under which he earns bonuses if Activision Blizzard meets certain financial targets related to mergers and acquisitions. The contract locks him in until 2021. In February 2019, the non-profit organization As You Sow ranked Kotick 45th in a list of the 100 most over-paid chief executive officers of the United States. A 180% increase in Activision Blizzard's share price since March 2016 triggered an incentive bonus in Kotick's 2016 contract. Kotick was expected to receive a bonus at $200 million, which has been reduced to a bonus package of $155 million following criticism.

Business strategy controversy 
Some statements Kotick has made about his business strategy have led to controversy. He has focused on developing intellectual property which can be, in his words, "exploited" over a long period, to the exclusion of new titles which cannot guarantee sequels. Kotick described this business strategy as "narrow and deep" or "annualizable" and cited it as key to attracting development talent who may not be drawn to "speculative franchises."

During Activision Blizzard's Q2 2009 financial results conference, Kotick was asked about his "comfort level"  regarding pricing of some of his new games. After Activision Publishing CEO Mike Griffith answered that there was "strong retailer acceptance and support" for the pricing plan, Kotick joked that "if it was left to me, I would raise the prices even further." Although Phil Elliot of Gamesindustry.biz understood the comment as a joke, he added that the comment could be seen as "insensitive at a time when consumers are likely to be feeling the economic pinch."

In another incident, Kotick has stated during the 2009 Deutsche Bank Securities Technology Conference that "The goal that I had in bringing a lot of the packaged goods folks into Activision about 10 years ago was to take all the fun out of making video games." Kotick continued to say that they "have been able to instill the culture, the skepticism and pessimism and fear that you should have in an economy like we are in today. And so, while generally people talk about the recession, we are pretty good at keeping people focused on the deep depression." Following the backlash on the statement, Kotick has commented that "Sometimes that commitment to excellence, well, you can come across as being like a dick. And when I say things like 'taking the fun out of making video games', it was a line that has been often-quoted lately, but it was a line I used for investors."

Honors and recognition 

 Ranked 50th in Vanity Fair'''s 2016 "New Establishment List"
 Ranked 75th on Harvard Business Review's 2016 "Best Performing CEOs in the World"
 Ranked 24th in 2016 and 27th in 2015 on the Adweek'' list of "Top 100 Leaders in Media"

Personal life and philanthropy 
A native of Long Island, New York, Kotick resides in California with his family. Bobby married Nina Kotick and they have 3 daughters: Grace, Emily and Audrey. He and his wife divorced in late 2012. Kotick dated Sheryl Sandberg from 2016 to 2019. His home in Beverly Hills is filled with Abstract Expressionist art. Kotick has donated to University of Michigan sports.

Kotick identifies as a libertarian and donated to the National Republican Senatorial Committee in 2007 and 2008. He endorsed Democratic candidate Hillary Clinton in the run-up for the 2016 U.S. presidential election.

In 2011, Kotick had a cameo appearance in the film Moneyball as Oakland Athletics co-owner Stephen Schott.

In October 2009, Kotick co-founded the Call of Duty Endowment (CODE), a non-profit benefit corporation. The endowment helps soldiers transition to civilian careers after their military service by funding nonprofit organizations. As of 2022, Kotick retain his position on CODE's board. During the COVID-19 crisis, CODE has advocated for employing veteran medics and hospital corpsman as emergency medical technicians and paramedics. Medics are among the most unemployed category of Army veterans.

References

External links 
 

Living people
American chief executives
1963 births
Video game businesspeople
Directors of Yahoo!
American corporate directors
University of Michigan alumni
Activision Blizzard
Directors of The Coca-Cola Company
American billionaires